Stracciatella is a variety of gelato, consisting of milk-based ice cream filled with fine, irregular shavings of chocolate. It was originally created in Bergamo, northern Italy, at the Ristorante La Marianna in 1961. It was inspired by stracciatella soup, made from egg and broth, which is popular around Rome. It is one of the most renowned Italian gelato flavors.

Description 

Makers produce the effect by drizzling melted chocolate into plain milk ice cream towards the end of the churning process; chocolate solidifies immediately coming in contact with the cold ice cream, and is then broken up and incorporated into the ice cream with a spatula. This process creates the shreds of chocolate that give stracciatella its name. (Stracciatella in Italian means 'little shred'.) While stracciatella ice cream traditionally involves milk, ice cream and milk chocolate, modern variations can also be made with vanilla and dark chocolate.

Origin 

Enrico Panattoni, the owner of La Marianna, a gelateria in Bergamo in northern Italy, invented the dish in 1961. According to Panattoni, the idea came to him after he had grown tired of stirring eggs into broth to satisfy customers of his restaurant who kept asking for stracciatella soup. 

He was passionate about cooking and pastry, after various and repeated experiments, he invented a particular kind of ice cream made of a very white cream with irregular pieces of dark chocolate inside. During the creaming process of Fiordilatte, he inserted a dose of hot dark chocolate that, thanks to the whipping of the blades, shredded the chocolate while it solidified. The effect is similar to one of the most popular dishes of his restaurant, named the Roman stracciatella.

The melted chocolate that solidifies and shatters in the batch freezer is reminiscent of the egg that binds in the boiling broth of the Roman stracciatella. "Roman stracciatella was the most famous consommé and, as for that soup, I was looking for an ice cream that could be loved and appreciated by my customers" said Panattoni, the inventor of stracciatella.

See also
 List of ice cream flavors

Notes and references

Explanatory notes

References 

Flavors of ice cream
Products introduced in 1962